People's Movement of Kyrgyzstan is an electoral alliance formed on September 22, 2004 in Kyrgyzstan. Kurmanbek Bakiyev was chosen as the movement's Chairman on November 5 who later became president of Kyrgyzstan.People's Movement of Kyrgyzstan was created to contest February 2005 Parliamentary elections.   

Following his election as President in 2005, Bakiyev resigned as Chairman of the movement. The current leadership has been highly critical of Bakiyev since his election, notably because of his failure to quickly pass key reforms. It also passed a resolution on December 24, 2005 calling for the President to move towards adopting a new constitution.  

The movement had the following members
Party of Communists of Kyrgyzstan
Communist Party of Kyrgyzstan
Republican Party of Kyrgyzstan
Asaba
Kairran
Democratic Movement of Kyrgyzstan
Erkindik
Erkin Kyrgyzstan
New Kyrgyzstan

Following the Tulip Revolution of 2005, the future of the movement remains unclear

Politics of Kyrgyzstan
Political organisations based in Kyrgyzstan